Carmelo Bentancur (born July 4, 1899, date of death unknown) was born in Durazno, Uruguay. He enlisted in the army with his brother, Cecilio, and served as a pilot but after an air accident he joined the cavalry.

He was several times the national fencing champion and was the Uruguayan representative in the 1936 Summer Olympics in Berlin.

References

1899 births
Year of death missing
Uruguayan male sabre fencers
Olympic fencers of Uruguay
Fencers at the 1936 Summer Olympics